Steliyan Popchev (Bulgarian: Стелиян Попчев) (born 8 April 1976 in Stara Zagora) is a Bulgarian former footballer who played as a defender and is currently administrator at Beroe after previously being employed as administrative director. Popchev's career is mainly associated with Beroe but he also represented Olympik Teteven, Cherno More, Lokomotiv Stara Zagora and Minyor Radnevo.

References

1976 births
Living people
Sportspeople from Stara Zagora
Bulgarian footballers
First Professional Football League (Bulgaria) players
PFC Beroe Stara Zagora players
PFC Cherno More Varna players
FC Dunav Ruse players
Association football defenders